This is a list of African Americans who have served in statewide elected executive offices in the United States, whether they were elected, succeeded or appointed to such elected office. These state constitutional officers have their duties and qualifications mandated in state constitutions. This list includes those directly elected to state constitutional boards and commissions, whether statewide or by district. This list does not include those elected to serve in non-executive branches of government, such as justices of the state supreme courts or at-large members of the state legislatures. This list also excludes federal legislators, such as the two members of the United States Senate elected from each state or at-large members of the United States House of Representatives.

Summary

Governors

Italics denotes acting governor

Territorial governors

Italics denotes acting governor

Lieutenant-governors

Italics denotes acting lieutenant governor

Attorneys general

Italics denotes acting attorney general

Territorial attorneys general

Italics denotes acting attorney general

Secretaries of state

Italics denotes acting secretary of state

Labor commissioners

Italics denotes acting labor commissioner

Auditors and comptrollers

Italics denotes acting auditor or comptroller

Superintendents of education

Italics denotes acting superintendent

Treasurers

Italics denotes acting treasurer

Public utilities or railroad commissioners

Italics denotes acting public utilities or railroad commissioner

Elected State Boards of Education

See also

 African-American officeholders during and following the Reconstruction era
 List of African-American officeholders (1900–1959)
 List of African–American Republicans
 List of African American firsts
 List of first African-American mayors
 List of African-American statewide elected officials

References

State constitutional officers of the United States